1866 in archaeology

Explorations
Architect Thomas Drew draws attention to the significance of St. Audoen's Church, Dublin, Ireland.

Excavations
Discovery and first excavation of Fertőrákos mithraeum.

Publications
 Posthumous publication by Édouard Lartet of Henry Christy's Reliquiae Aquitanicae, being contributions to the archaeology and palaeontology of Perigord and the adjacent provinces of southern France commences.

Finds
 February 26 - The Calaveras Skull is discovered in California. Purported to be evidence of humans in North America during the Pliocene epoch, it turns out to be a hoax.
 The prehistoric sculpture Swimming Reindeer is found in France.
 The first copy of the Decree of Canopus is found at Tanis.

Awards

Miscellaneous

Births
 May 23 - Edgar J. Banks, American antiquarian (d. 1945).
 June 26 - George Herbert, 5th Earl of Carnarvon, British Egyptological excavation sponsor (d. 1923).

Deaths

See also
 List of years in archaeology
 1865 in archaeology
 1867 in archaeology

References

Archaeology
Archaeology by year
Archaeology
Archaeology